5086 is an aluminium–magnesium alloy, primarily alloyed with magnesium. It is not strengthened by heat treatment, instead becoming stronger due to strain hardening, or cold mechanical working of the material.

Since heat treatment doesn't strongly affect the strength, 5086 can be readily welded and retain most of its mechanical strength. The good results with welding and good corrosion properties in seawater make 5086 extremely popular for vessel gangways, building boat and yacht hulls.

Basic properties

Chemical properties
The alloy composition of 5086 is:
 Chromium - 0.05%–0.25% by weight
 Copper - 0.1% maximum
 Iron - 0.5% maximum
 Magnesium - 3.5%–4.5%
 Manganese - 0.2%–0.7%
 Silicon - 0.4% maximum
 Titanium - 0.15% maximum
 Zinc - 0.25% maximum
 Others each 0.05% maximum
 Others total 0.15% maximum
 Remainder Aluminium

Mechanical properties
The mechanical properties of 5086 vary significantly with hardening and temperature.

–O hardening

–H32 hardening

–H34 hardening

–H112 hardening

–H116 hardening

Uses
5086 is the preferred hull material for small aluminium boats or larger yachts. Its high strength and good corrosion resistance make it an excellent match for yachting.

5086 has a tendency to undergo Stress corrosion cracking and is not used much in aircraft construction as a result.

5086 has been used in vehicle armor, notably in the M113 Armored Personnel Carrier and M2 Bradley Infantry fighting vehicle.

Welding
5086 is often assembled using arc welding, typically MIG or TIG welding. The newer technique of Friction stir welding has also been successfully applied but is not in common use.

Arc welding reduces mechanical properties to no worse than –O hardening condition. The relatively low decrease in ultimate strength (about 10%) is extremely good performance for an aluminium alloy.

References

Further reading
 "Properties of Wrought Aluminum and Aluminum Alloys: 5086, Alclad 5086", Properties and Selection: Nonferrous Alloys and Special-Purpose Materials, Vol 2, ASM Handbook, ASM International, 1990, p. 93-4.

Aluminium alloy table 

Aluminium–magnesium alloys